José Machado may refer to:

José Machado (rower) (born 1928), Portuguese Olympic rower
José Ramón Machado Ventura (born 1930), vice-president of Cuba (2008 to date)
José Machado (São Tomé and Príncipe), Portuguese governor of São Tomé and Príncipe (1955–56)
José Manuel Machado (1756–1852), Spanish soldier, ranchero, early citizen of the pueblo of San Diego